Slobodan Lučić (born 23 February 1988) is a Serbian professional footballer who plays as a defender for Budućnost Dobanovci. Lučić spent entire career in the club and currently playing his 19. season that puts him in a top of the List of one-club men in association football

Career
Lučić was born in Belgrade on 23 February 1988.  He spent his entire senior and youth career with Budućnost Dobanovci and played hundreds of games for the club in various levels of football competition in Serbia.

By winning the first place in the Belgrade Zone League in the 2011–12 season, he won a place in the Serbian League Belgrade with the club for the next competition year. Four years later, after the end of the 2015–16 season, Budućnost became a member of the federal rank of the competition for the first time in its history.

Statistics

References

External links
 
 
 

Living people
1988 births
Footballers from Belgrade
Serbian footballers
Association football defenders
FK Budućnost Dobanovci players
Serbian First League players